Heather is a common English speaking nation given name, for girls.

Origin and meaning
The name Heather actually refers to a variety of small shrubs with pink or white flowers which commonly grow in rocky areas that is literally referred to as Heather, in English. The brush is native to Scotland and England, but it is more commonly found in Scotland due to its rocky territories. The name is derived from Middle English hather.

Heather has several other definitions. The most commonly known is as a reference to a color mixture; it is most often a pale shade of blue from blue itself to pink to even purple mixed with gray. However, many times it refers to any color that includes gray or gray streaks within it, such as what is known as Heather fabric.

The masculine form of the name is Heath.

Popularity and variations
Newspapers.com records the use of "Miss Heather" in reference to a girl's name as early as 2 August 1852, in The New York Times. An infant by the name of Miss Heather Campbell arrived on a ship from Glasgow in New York, with her mother.

The American Social Security Administration's records show it to already be in use in 1935, though it was rare at the time coming in at #997, barely making the top 1000 names of that era. The name is currently popular among the people of Generations X and Generation Y. The name itself peaked in popularity at #3, in 1975.

Heather, though a name found primarily in English speaking countries, has other variants simply because of its definition as a flowering plant. However its foreign names often closely resemble other words with meanings so is difficult to distinguish a given variant's origin as arising from the flower, or from that of another word. For example, the name Heidi in German resembles Heidekraut, which is the German word for the Heather shrubs, though the name Heidi is usually thought to mean "of noble birth" (a diminutive of the name Adelheid).  The 1988 dark comedy film, Heathers, satirized the name by associating it with "in-crowd" cliques of teen-age high school girls.

The name Erica actually has two meanings, one of which is related to the Heather plant whose Latin name is Ericaceae. Its other meaning of "ruler" is similar to that of the German meaning of Heidi. This leaves the impression that the shrub name and the meaning of "a noble" or "ruler" are similar, or it is a large coincidence.

Notable people
 Heather Angel (actress) (1909–1986), English actress
 Heather Angel (photographer) (born 1941), English photographer
 Heather M. Ferguson, professor, malaria vector biologist
 Heather B. Gardner (born 1971), American hip-hop artist
 Heather Bresch (born 1969), American business executive and CEO of Mylan
 Heather Booth (1945), American civil rights activist, feminist, and political strategist
 Heather Bown (born 1978), American volleyball player
 Heather E. Bullock, American social psychologist
 Heather Burge (born 1971), American basketball player
 Heather Childers, anchor for Fox and Friends First
 Heather Crowe (activist) (born 1945), Canadian anti-smoking campaigner
 Heather Dewey-Hagborg (born 1982), information artist and bio-hacker
 Heather Engebretson (born 1990), American lyric soprano
 Heather Foster (born 1966), Jamaican-born American professional bodybuilder
 Heather George (1907–1983), Australian commercial photographer
 Heather Graham (born 1970), American actress
 Heather Headley (born 1974), Trinidadian singer and actress
 Heather Hemmens (born 1984), American actress
 Heather Hunter (born 1969), American entertainer
 Heather Jones (born 1970), Canadian field hockey player
 Heather Kozar (born 1976), American model Playboy's playmate of the month January 1998
 Heather Kuttai, (born 1969 or 1970) Canadian Paralympic shooter
 Heather Kuzmich (born 1986), American fashion model and America's Next Top Model, Cycle 9 participant
 Heather Langenkamp (born 1964), American actress
 Heather Locklear (born 1961), American actress
 Heather Marks (born 1988), Canadian model
 Heather Matarazzo (born 1982), American actress
 Heather McCartney (born 1962), American-British potter and artist, daughter of Linda McCartney and adopted daughter of Paul McCartney
 Heather Mills (born 1968), British model and activist; the second wife of Paul McCartney
 Heather Morris (born 1987), American actress and dancer from Glee
 Heather Moyse (born 1978), Canadian bobsledder and rugby union player
 Heather North (1945–2017), American voice actress
 Heather Nova (born 1967), Bermudian singer-songwriter and poet
 Heather O'Reilly (born 1985), American soccer player
 Heather O'Rourke (1975–1988), American actress
 Heather Peace (born 1975), British actress
 Heather Raffo (born 1970), American actress
 Heather Small (born 1965), British singer
 Heather Standring (born 1928), British illustrator
 Heather Thomas (born 1957), American actress
 Heather Tom (born 1975), American actress
 Heather Wallace (born 1961), Canadian squash player
 Heather Whitestone (born 1973), Miss America winner

Fictional characters
 Heather Badcock, a victim in Agatha Christie's 1962 novel, The Mirror Crack'd from Side to Side.
 Heather Campbell, the first love of Connor MacLeod, the main protagonist of the Highlander film franchise (not to be confused with Duncan MacLeod of the television series spinoff)
 Heather Chandler, Heather Duke, and Heather McNamara, the eponymous clique from the 1988 teen film Heathers and the 2014 musical adaptation
 Heather Dante, daughter of Tony Soprano's consigliere, Silvio Dante, on The Sopranos
 Heather Farrell, a former character from the original Degrassi series
 Heather Gushue, a character in the film Cyberbully
 Heather Hart, a character in the novel Flow My Tears, The Policeman Said by Philip K. Dick
Heather Holloway, a character from the Netflix TV series Stranger Things
 Lady Heather (real name Heather Kessler), a character in CSI: Crime Scene Investigation
 Heather Mason, the female protagonist in Silent Hill 3
 Heather Owens, a character from Mr. Belvedere
 Heather Scott, a character in the 1989 action comedy film Speed Zone
 Heather Sinclair, a character in Degrassi: The Next Generation
 Heather Stevens Williams, a character from the American soap opera The Young and the Restless
 Heather Trott, a character from the British soap opera EastEnders
 Heather Roth, a character on a TV series The Ranch
 Heather Webber, character on the American soap opera, General Hospital
 Heather, the protagonist in the young adult novel The Faraway Lurs
 Heather, a main character in the Canadian animated series Total Drama
 Heather, a character from the game Fire Emblem: Radiant Dawn.
 Heather the Violet Fairy, from the children's book series Rainbow Magic
 Heather, from the Dreamworks' 2006 3D computer-animated film Over the Hedge
 Heather Wold, the name of the Little Red-Haired Girl from Peanuts

References

Given names
English given names
English feminine given names
Irish feminine given names
Scottish feminine given names
Welsh feminine given names